Pseudomyrmecinae is a small subfamily of ants containing only three genera of slender, large-eyed arboreal ants, predominantly tropical or subtropical in distribution. In the course of adapting to arboreal conditions (unlike the predominantly ground-dwelling myrmeciins), the pseudomyrmecines diversified and came to occupy and retain a much wider geographic range.

Pseudomyrmecinae consists of 230 described species in three genera. Among those, 32 species live in plant domatia, making them the most diverse plant-occupying ant group worldwide. 

Pseudomyrmecinae Smith, 1952
 Pseudomyrmecini Smith, 1952
 Myrcidris Ward, 1990
 Pseudomyrmex Lund, 1831
 Tetraponera Smith, 1852

References

External links

 
Ant subfamilies